This is a list of episodes for Season 6 of Late Night with Conan O'Brien, which aired from September 15, 1998, to August 20, 1999.

Series overview

Season 6

References

Episodes (season 06)